Kudahuvadhoo (Dhivehi: ކުޑަހުވަދޫ) is one of the inhabited islands of Dhaalu Atoll in the Maldives.

History

Hawittas
Kudahuvadhoo has one of the mysterious mounds known as hawittas. These mounds are the ruins of Buddhist temples from the pre-Islamic period (before the 10th century) that have not been excavated yet. Thor Heyerdahl, who explored the island in the early 1980s, wrote that the ancient coral-stone mosque of Kudahuvadhoo possesses some of the finest masonry ever seen in the world.

Islam In Kudahuvadhoo

Kudahuvadhoo Loamaafaanu (official copper plates with inscriptions), provides that king Al-Sultan Valla Dio Kalaminjaa Siri Raa-Araa Desvaru Mahaa Radun (Dhivehi: އައްސުލްޠާން ވައްލާ ދިއޯ ކަލަމިންޖާ ސިރީ ރާއަރާދޭސްވަރު މަހާރަދުން),  who ruled the  Maldives  from 1233.AD to 1258.AD was responsible for spreading Islam to the island. The inscription provides that the citizens of Kudahuvadhoo became Muslim 88 years after the country officially adopted Islam.

Malaysia Airlines Flight 370
On 19 March 2014 the New York Post said that residents of Kudahuvadhoo reported having seen a low-flying airplane travelling north to southeast towards Addu (the southern tip of the Maldives) resembling the missing Malaysia Airlines Flight 370, which disappeared in midflight to Beijing from Malaysia on 8 March 2014. This lent credence to one of the theories that the flight had been commandeered by someone who intended to land the plane in a remote area. Kudahuvadhoo had no airstrip at that time. The claim that the sighted jet was MH370 was subsequently rejected by Malaysia's minister of transport and defence.

Geography
It is the capital of the atoll.

Demography

According to the 2014 Census, conducted in September 2014, Kudahuvadhoo had a resident population of 2447. (this number includes the residents of Gemendhoo and Vaanee evacuated to Kudahuvadhoo after the Boxing Day Tsunami of 2004).

Economy
People from other islands come to Kudahuvadhoo for better education and health facilities. Moreover, Kudahuvadhoo is the urban hub in the whole central area of the Maldives, which includes Faafu atoll, Meemu atoll and Dhaalu atoll.

Transport
Kudahuvadhoo is a fast developing island in the Maldives. Dhaalu Airport, the regional airport for Dhaalu atoll is located on Kudahuvadhoo and opened to the public in July 2017. The airport has a 1800m long runway making it one of the largest domestic airports in the Maldives.

References

Populated places in the Maldives
Islands of the Maldives